Rose Hills may refer to:

Rose Hills Memorial Park, a cemetery
Rose Hills, California, a census-designated place consisting of the area around the cemetery
Rose Hills, Los Angeles, a neighborhood surrounding Rose Hill Park.

See also 
Rose Hill (disambiguation)